Jacqueline de Rohan, Marquise de Rothelin (c. 1520 – 1587) was a French court official and aristocrat. She was the daughter of Charles de Rohan and Jeanne de Saint-Severin, and regent of the Neufchâtel and of Valangin during the minority of her son Leonor, Duke de Longueville, Duke d' Estouteville.

Biography
Her paternal grandparents were Pierre de Rohan, Viscount de Fronsac and Françoise de Penhoet. Her maternal grandparents were Bernard de Saint-Severin, Prince of Besignano, and Jeanne Eléonore Piccolomini. The latter was a descendant of King Alfonso V of Aragon and his mistress Giraldona Carlino.

She served as lady-in-waiting to both Eleanor of Austria (fille d'honneur 1531-1536 and Dame d'honneur 1538-1543) and Catherine de Medici.

Her husband, Francois of Orleans-Longueville, Marquis de Rothelin, died on 25 October 1548, and in watching her son Leonor's interests in Neuchâtel she was brought into contact with the reformers in Switzerland. She then embraced Protestantism and turned her château at Blandy, in Brie, into a refuge for Huguenots.

In 1567 she underwent a term of imprisonment at the Louvre for harbouring Protestants.

Marriage and children 
On 19 June 1536, at Lyon, she married François of Orléans-Longueville, Marquis de Rothelin, Prince of Chalet-Aillon, Viscount of Melun (2 March 1513 – 25 October 1548), son of Louis I d'Orléans, duc de Longueville, Duke of Neufchatel, Prince of Chatel-Aillon and Johanna of Baden-Hochberg, Countess of Neufchatel and Margravine of Rothelin, with whom she had two children:
 Leonor, Duke de Longueville, Duke d' Estouteville, Prince of the Blood (1540–1573), married in 1563, Marie d'Estouteville, by whom he had issue, including Henri I, 8th Duke de Longueville.
 Françoise d'Orléans-Longueville (5 April 1549 – 11 June 1601), who was born posthumously. On 8 November 1565, she married Huguenot leader Louis I de Bourbon, Prince de Condé, as his second wife, by whom she had issue. The House of Savoy-Carignan descended from their union.

Notes

References

1520s births
1587 deaths
Jacqueline de Rohan
Marquesses of Rothelin
Huguenots
16th-century women rulers
16th-century French people
People of the French Wars of Religion
Court of Francis I of France
French marchionesses